is a 1996 Japan-exclusive sports video game released by Tonkin House for the Game Boy handheld.

Summary
This title is a compilation of five sports games released between 1989 and 1991.

1989 - Seaside Volley (known in North America as Malibu Beach Volleyball)
1990 - Boxing (known in North America as Heavyweight Championship Boxing)
1990 - Roadster
1991 - Soccer (known in Europe as Football International)
1991 - Dodge Boy

External links

1996 video games
Game Boy-only games
Japan-exclusive video games
Racing video games
Video game compilations
Multiple-sport video games
Tonkin House games
Tose (company) games
Multiplayer and single-player video games
Game Boy games
Video games developed in Japan